Metropolitan Tulsa Transit Authority, usually known as MTTA  or Tulsa Transit, is the public transit system operating buses and paratransit for Tulsa, Oklahoma. In existence since 1968, the system consists of 21 regular routes and 4 night routes, with two major transit hubs: Memorial Midtown Station at 7952 E. 33rd St. in Midtown Tulsa, and the Denver Avenue Station at 319 S. Denver across from the BOK Center in Downtown.

History

The city's first "Aero" bus rapid transit line began operating on November 17, 2019, on Peoria Avenue from 52nd Street North to 81st Street South and Lewis. The route has 52 stations and buses that arrive every 15 to 30 minutes. The service officially launched on December 19, 2019.

Operations

Tulsa Transit operates regular fixed service Monday to Saturday, from early mornings to early evenings. After daytime service ceases between 7 p.m. and 8 p.m., the service operates night service on its "Nightlines" until midnight.  Bus frequencies are 30 or 60 minutes Monday through Saturday. A fixed route service with reserved deviations permitted (identical to Nightline routes), operates on Sundays. There is no service on public holidays.

The service used to be known for request stops: bus stops were infrequently signed and would stop on request typically after any intersection where it is safe to do so.  This practice was abolished, and stops posted, in a September 2019 system redesign.

Routes

Tulsa Transit operates a variety of routes all over the city, and into Jenks, Broken Arrow and Sand Springs although it does not run as a full-time bus fleet in those locations. Each set of routes is grouped by the first of the three digits, as follows:
 1xx  routes serve Denver Avenue Station to various parts of the city.
 2xx routes serve various parts of the city between Denver Avenue and Memorial Midtown Stations.
 3xx routes serve Memorial Midtown Station to various parts of the city without going to Downtown Tulsa.
 4xx routes serve neither station, but serve parts of the city.
 5xx routes serve areas outside of Tulsa.
 6xx routes run during major events as shuttles.
 7xx routes are bus rapid transit routes.
 8xx routes are operate only on Sundays, or at night, and serve each quadrant of the city.
 9xx routes are express and link Downtown Tulsa and outlying park and rides.

Fleet

Active

Notes

References

External links
Official website
"Tulsa's Smart City Transportation Initiative." City of Tulsa. February 4, 2016.  Long-range study for U.S. Department of Transportation, Beyond Traffic: The Smart City Challenge.

Bus transportation in Oklahoma
Transit agencies in Oklahoma
Transportation in Tulsa, Oklahoma